Gouger Street is a major street in the centre of Adelaide, South Australia. It was named after Robert Gouger, the first Colonial Secretary of South Australia.

Restaurant district 
Gouger Street is known for its high-end international restaurants and cafes. Cuisines found along Gouger Street include Italian, French, Argentinian, Malaysian, Vietnamese, Chinese and Thai. Many of the restaurants on Gouger Street have won awards. Some of the better known ones are Star of Siam (which specializes in Thai cuisine), La Porchetta (Italian) and Chi on Gouger.

The southern entrance of the Adelaide Central Market is on Gouger street. A paifang, comprising an archway erected by the city council and two lions donated by the People's Republic of China, marks the southern entrance to the Moonta Street Chinatown.

See also

References

Streets in Adelaide
Restaurant districts and streets in Australia